Astoria Grande is a cruise ship which entered service as Aida in 1996 in the fleet of German cruise company, AIDA Cruises. She was their first cruise ship and in 2001 became AIDAcara.

History
The ship was built, at a cost of DM 300 million, by Kvaerner Masa-Yards at their Turku New Shipyard in (Finland), for Deutsche Seetouristik/Arkona Reisen, Rostock, as a "Clubschiff" (Club Ship), She was launched in 1996 and entered service in June that year with the name Aida. When P&O Cruises purchased a controlling stake in Arkona Reisen in 1999, they transferred the ship, and it became part of the new Aida Cruises fleet. She was renamed Aidacara (styled AIDAcara) in 2001, after two sister ships entered operation as AIDAvita and AIDAaura. In 2005, the vessel underwent a refit, which increased the number of cabins.

References

External links

  Official AIDAcara website
 
 Deck Plans of AIDAcara

Ships built in Turku
Ships of AIDA Cruises
1996 ships